The Driftwood River is a  tributary of the East Fork of the White River in central Indiana in the United States.  Via the White, Wabash and Ohio rivers, it is part of the watershed of the Mississippi River.  It is a short river, formed by the confluence of two longer streams a short distance upstream of its mouth.

Course
It flows generally southwardly through northwestern Bartholomew County to Columbus, where it joins the Flatrock River to form the East Fork of the White River.

Near Edinburgh, IN, Driftwood River has a mean annual discharge of 1,210 cubic feet per second.

See also
List of Indiana rivers

References

Rivers of Indiana
Rivers of Bartholomew County, Indiana
Rivers of Johnson County, Indiana
Tributaries of the Wabash River